Mexcala ovambo is a jumping spider species in the genus Mexcala that lives in Namibia. The female was first described by Wanda Wesołowska in 2009.

References

Endemic fauna of Namibia
Salticidae
Fauna of Namibia
Spiders of Africa
Spiders described in 2009
Taxa named by Wanda Wesołowska